Washington Square Serenade is the 12th studio album by American singer-songwriter Steve Earle, released in 2007.  The album features the singer's wife Allison Moorer on the track "Days Aren't Long Enough," and the Brazilian group Forro in the Dark on the track "City of Immigrants."  The track "Way Down in the Hole," written by Tom Waits, was used as the opening theme song for the fifth and final season of the HBO series The Wire, on which Earle played a recurring character named Walon.  The album was released on September 25, 2007, on New West Records. In February 2008 it won a Grammy Award for Best Contemporary Folk/Americana Album.

Track listing
All songs written by Steve Earle unless otherwise noted.
 "Tennessee Blues" – 2:39
 "Down Here Below" – 4:02
 "Satellite Radio" – 4:09
 "City of Immigrants" – 4:18
 "Sparkle and Shine" – 3:12
 "Come Home to Me" – 3:47
 "Jericho Road" – 3:36
 "Oxycontin Blues" – 2:54
 "Red is the Color" – 4:19
 "Steve's Hammer (for Pete)" – 3:15
 "Days Aren't Long Enough" (Earle, Allison Moorer) – 3:01
 "Way Down in the Hole" (Tom Waits) – 2:55

Personnel

Musicians
Steve Earle - vocals, guitar, mandolin, bouzouki, banjo, harmonica, tambura, harmonium
Allison Moorer - vocals
John Medeski - organ, electric piano, mellotron, harmonium
Jeremy Chatzky - acoustic, electric bass
John Spiker - electric bass
Marty Beller - drums
Patrick Earle - percussion
Forro in the Dark:
Mauro Refosco - zabumba
Davi Viera - timba, triangle
Jorge Continentino - bamboo flute
Smokey Hormel - baritone guitar
"The Downtown Proletariat Choir":
Patrick Earle, John King, Noah Goldstein, Josh Wilbur, Lee Foster, Charlie Stavish, Paul Bannister, Collin Hart, Petey

Production
Produced and mixed by John King
Recorded at Electric Lady Studios, New York City
Mixed at The Nest, Hollywood, California
Engineered by Josh Wilbur & Tom Camuso
Assisted by Noah Goldstein
Programming by Andrew Clark & John Spiker
Logistics - Patrick Earle
"Pro Tools Therapy" - Ray Kennedy
Mastered - Jim Demain at Yes Master Studios
Assisted by Alex McCollough

Artwork
Cover artwork by Tony Fitzpatrick
Photos by Ted Barron
Design by Dawn Hancock for Firebelly Design

Chart performance

References

2007 albums
Steve Earle albums
Grammy Award for Best Contemporary Folk Album
Albums produced by John King (record producer)
New West Records albums